Caldume (Italian) or quarumi (Sicilian) is a Sicilian dish of veal tripe stewed with vegetables, served as a street food in Palermo and Catania.

All parts of the tripe (rumen, omasum, abomasum) as well as the duodenum are stewed with carrots, parsley, tomato, and onion. It is served hot, with salt, pepper, oil, and lemon.

Vendors of quarumi, called quarumaru, are often found in the public markets.

Notes

Palermitan cuisine
Cuisine of Sicily
Offal
Italian stews